Dazoxiben is an orally active thromboxane synthase inhibitor. It has shown a significant clinical improvement in patients with Raynaud's syndrome.

Synthesis

One convenient synthesis starts with the O-chloroethyl ether of p-hydroxybenzamide and proceeds bydisplacement with imidazole to give 2. Hydrolysis of the amide function completes the synthesis of dazoxiben.

References

Antithrombotic agents
Imidazoles
Benzoic acids